Mount Brew is a rounded mountain in southwestern British Columbia, Canada, located  southwest of Whistler in the Pacific Ranges of the Coast Mountains. A public cabin run by the Varsity Outdoor Club, Brew Hut, is located near the summit. The alpine area is a popular destination for hiking in the summer and backcountry ski touring in the winter and spring.

Mount Brew is a volcanic feature in the Mount Cayley volcanic field of the central Garibaldi Volcanic Belt of the Canadian Cascade Arc. It formed during the Pleistocene period when volcanic activity in this area occurred under glacial ice during the last glacial period. Although it had a vigorous start, the eruption that formed Mount Brew was not sufficiently sustained to form a larger edifice that could break through the surrounding ice and water to form a tuya. Instead, the eruption produced a subglacial mound.

See also
List of volcanoes in Canada
Volcanism of Canada
Volcanism of Western Canada

References

Volcanoes of British Columbia
One-thousanders of British Columbia
Subduction volcanoes
Subglacial mounds of Canada
Pleistocene volcanoes
Mount Cayley volcanic field